is a railway station on the Sanriku Railway Company’s Rias Line located in the village of Fudai, Iwate Prefecture, Japan.

Lines
Fudai Station is served by the  Rias Line, and is located 136.9 rail kilometers from the terminus of the line at Sakari Station.

Station layout 
The station has a two opposed side platforms. The station is staffed.

Platforms

Adjacent stations

History 
Fudai Station opened on 20 July 1975 as a station on the Japan National Railways (JNR) Kuji Line. On 1 April 1984, upon the privatization of the Kuji Line, the station came under the control of the Sanriku Railway Company. Following the 11 March 2011 Tōhoku earthquake and tsunami, services on a portion of the Sanriku Railway were suspended. The portion from Rikuchū-Noda to Tanohata resumed operations on 1 April 2012. Minami-Rias Line, a portion of Yamada Line, and Kita-Rias Line constitute Rias Line on 23 March 2019. Accordingly, this station became an intermediate station of Rias Line.

Surrounding area 
 National Route 45
Fudai Village Hall
Fudai Post Office
Kurosaki Lighthouse

See also
 List of railway stations in Japan

References

External links

  

Railway stations in Iwate Prefecture
Rias Line
Railway stations in Japan opened in 1975
Fudai, Iwate